The Academy (Traditional Chinese: 學警雄心) is a TVB modern drama series broadcast in June 2005.

The series follows the lives of a group of new Hong Kong Police recruits as they proceed through training at the Hong Kong Police training school (PTS). Within these 27 weeks, each of them learned their lessons, each of them become more mature, each of them become a better person as the relationship between the students and the teachers grows stronger and stronger.

A direct sequel, On the First Beat (學警出更) was produced and broadcast in 2007 continued with Ron Ng and Sammul Chan, alongside Joey Yung, Sonija Kwok and Michael Tao. Another sequel, E.U. (學警狙擊) was produced and released in 2009 continued with Ron Ng and Sammul Chan, alongside Michael Miu, Kathy Chow, Elanne Kong, and Michael Tse. Michael Miu reprises a new role as a triad boss in E.U., which is unrelated to his role in The Academy.

Cast

Main cast

Other cast

External links
TVB.com The Academy - Official Website 

TVB dramas
2005 Hong Kong television series debuts
2005 Hong Kong television series endings